Rocha Estância is a mountain in the southwestern part of the island Boa Vista in Cape Verde, east of the village of Povoação Velha. Its elevation is 357 meters. It is part of a protected area (category Natural Monument) covering 253 ha. The Our Lady of Conception church is located at the western foot of the mountain.

See also
List of mountains in Cape Verde

References

External links
 Áreas protegidas, Cabo Verde (Protected areas of Cape Verde) 

Geography of Boa Vista, Cape Verde
Estancia